Barreirense Basket is the professional basketball team of F.C. Barreirense, a sports club from Barreiro, Portugal. The club plays in the Portuguese top league, the LPB.

Honors

Portuguese Championships:

 2 Portuguese Championships (1956/1957; 1957/1958)
 6 Portuguese Cups (1956/1957; 1959/1960; 1962/1963; 1981/1982; 1983/1984; 1984/1985)

Participation in European Competitions

 12/03/1958: FC Barreirense 51-68 Real Madrid CF (Barreiro)
 20/04/1958: Real Madrid CF 86-40 FC Barreirense (Madrid)
  ??/??/1958: Étoile de Charville 77-40 FC Barreirense (Charville)
 22/11/1958: FC Barreirense 27-63 Étoile de Charville (Barreiro)

Current Squad 2011–2012

Notable players

Notable coaches
 Arturo Alvarez
 António Herrera
 Antonio Paulo
 José Luis Lopes
 José Francisco Fernandes
 Francisco Cabrita
 Manuel Fernandes

Basketball teams in Portugal